Pork barrel, or simply pork, is a metaphor for the appropriation of government spending for localized projects secured solely or primarily to bring money to a representative's district. 

The usage originated in American English, and it indicates a negotiated way of political particularism.

Political science
Scholars use it as a technical term regarding legislative control of local appropriations. In election campaigns, the term is used in derogatory fashion to attack opponents. 

Typically, "pork" involves national funding for government programs whose economic or service benefits are concentrated in a particular area but whose costs are spread among all taxpayers. Public works projects, certain national defense spending projects, and agricultural subsidies are the most commonly cited examples.

Citizens Against Government Waste outlines seven criteria by which spending in the United States can be classified as "pork":

 Requested by only one chamber of Congress
 Not specifically authorized
 Not competitively awarded
 Not requested by the President
 Greatly exceeds the President's budget request or the previous year's funding
 Not the subject of Congressional hearings
 Serves only a local or special interest.

History and etymology
The term pork barrel politics usually refers to spending which is intended to benefit constituents of a politician in return for their political support, either in the form of campaign contributions or votes. 

In the popular 1863 story "The Children of the Public", Edward Everett Hale used the term pork barrel as a homely metaphor for any form of public spending to the citizenry. However, after the American Civil War, the term came to be used in a derogatory sense. The Oxford English Dictionary dates the modern sense of the term from 1873. 

Pork barrel originally came from storing meat. By the 1870s, references to "pork" were common in Congress, and the term was further popularized by a 1919 article by Chester Collins Maxey in the National Municipal Review, which reported on certain legislative acts known to members of Congress as "pork barrel bills". He claimed that the phrase originated in a pre-Civil War practice of giving slaves a barrel of salt pork as a reward and requiring them to compete among themselves to get their share of the handout.
More generally, a barrel of salt pork was a common larder item in 19th-century households, and could be used as a measure of the family's financial well-being. For example, in his 1845 novel The Chainbearer, James Fenimore Cooper wrote: "I hold a family to be in a desperate way, when the mother can see the bottom of the pork barrel."

Examples
An early example of pork barrel politics in the United States was the Bonus Bill of 1817, which was introduced by Democrat John C. Calhoun to construct highways linking the Eastern and Southern United States to its Western frontier using the earnings bonus from the Second Bank of the United States. Calhoun argued for it using general welfare and post roads clauses of the United States Constitution. Although he approved of the economic development goal, President James Madison vetoed the bill as unconstitutional.

One of the most famous alleged pork-barrel projects was the Big Dig in Boston, Massachusetts. The Big Dig was a project to relocate an existing  section of the Interstate Highway System underground. The official planning phase started in 1982; the construction work was done between 1991 and 2006; and the project concluded on December 31, 2007. It ended up costing US$14.6 billion, or over US$4 billion per mile. Tip O'Neill (D-Mass), after whom one of the Big Dig tunnels was named, pushed to have the Big Dig funded by the federal government while he was the Speaker of the United States House of Representatives.

During the 2008 U.S. presidential campaign, the Gravina Island Bridge (also known as the "Bridge to Nowhere") in Alaska was cited as an example of pork barrel spending. The bridge, pushed for by Republican Senator Ted Stevens, was projected to cost $398 million and would connect the island's 50 residents and the Ketchikan International Airport to Revillagigedo Island and Ketchikan.

Pork-barrel projects, which differ from earmarks, are added to the federal budget by members of the appropriation committees of United States Congress. This allows delivery of federal funds to the local district or state of the appropriation committee member, often accommodating major campaign contributors. To a certain extent, a member of Congress is judged by their ability to deliver funds to their constituents. The Chairman and the ranking member of the U.S. Senate Committee on Appropriations are in a position to deliver significant benefits to their states. Researchers Anthony Fowler and Andrew B. Hall claim that this still does not account for the high reelection rates of incumbent representatives in American legislatures. Former Hawaii Senator Daniel Inouye described himself as “the No. 1 earmarks guy in the U.S. Congress.” Inouye regularly passed earmarks for funding in the state of Hawaii including military and transportation spending.

See also

Citizens Against Government Waste
Corporate welfare
Earmark (politics)
Federal Funding Accountability and Transparency Act of 2006
Golden Fleece Award
Government waste
Money loop
People's Initiative Against Pork Barrel
Porkbusters
Spoils system

References 

Political terminology of the United States
Public choice theory
Conflict of interest
English-language idioms
Ethically disputed political practices
Political slurs
Metaphors referring to objects
Metaphors referring to food and drink